The Bride is a 1985 period horror film directed by Franc Roddam, and starring Sting, Jennifer Beals, Geraldine Page, and Clancy Brown. Based on Mary Shelley's 1818 novel Frankenstein; or, The Modern Prometheus, the film follows Baron Charles Frankenstein who creates a woman, Eva, while his original monster—believed to have been killed in a laboratory accident—escapes into the countryside.

The film, an international co-production between the United Kingdom and the United States, was released theatrically on August 16, 1985 by Columbia Pictures to generally negative reviews from critics. It was a commercial failure, grossing only $3.6 million.

Plot
Baron Charles Frankenstein, Dr. Zalhus, and Frankenstein's assistant, Paulus, attempt to create a female mate, Eva, for his creation. The team of scientists succeed in creating Eva, who is physically identical to a human and lacking the deformities of the monster. As such, she is revolted by the monster and rejects him. This causes the monster to fly into a rage and destroy Frankenstein's laboratory. Frankenstein, believing the monster has died, flees with Eva back to Castle Frankenstein. There he falls in love with her and, with the help of his friend Charles Clerval and housekeeper Mrs. Baumann, educates her with the goal of making her a perfect human mate.

The monster, having survived, wanders into the countryside where he befriends a dwarf, Rinaldo. As they learn more about one another, Rinaldo eventually gives the monster more humanity by gracing him with a name: Viktor ("he will win"). The men travel by foot through Europe, eventually arriving in Budapest, where they become involved with a circus owner named Magar, who hires them despite his dislike for Rinaldo. Meanwhile, as Eva acquires language and develops further cognizance, she begins to question her origin and, while visiting a decrepit mausoleum with Baron Charles, tells him she wishes to "go home."

The Baron has Eva accompany him to a formal party held by a Countess, where he introduces her. Eva is initially well-spoken and formal, impressing the Countess, Captain Josef Schoden, and other guests, but becomes agitated when a cat enters the room. Having no knowledge of the animal, Eva begins to scream at it, embarrassing the Baron. Several days later, while riding her horse near the castle, Eva is approached by Josef, who attempts to romance her. Josef informs Eva that the Baron was thrown out of university while studying medicine. She begins to question the Baron and his intentions.

Meanwhile, during a trapeze performance with the circus, Rinaldo is fatally injured in a fall. When Viktor learns that Magar deliberately tampered with Rinaldo's harness, causing the fall, he flies into a rage, flipping Magar's caravan over before murdering one of the performers. Viktor returns to the Castle and finds Eva outside on the grounds. Eva mistakes him for a vagrant, not recognizing him. Later, a mob from the circus arrives in the village in search of Viktor, and shackle him to a wall. Meanwhile, Eva disappears from the Castle. The Baron inquires of her whereabouts, and Mrs. Baumann reluctantly reveals that she has run way with Josef. The Baron locates the two lovers, and brings a defiant Eva back to the Castle. During an argument, the Baron finally reveals to Eva how he created her, using parts of corpses, and bringing her to life via an electric charge. This information mortifies Eva.

Viktor breaks free from his shackles and flees by horse to Castle Frankenstein, where the Baron confronts him. A fight ensues, and Viktor is chased to the top of the laboratory, where he throws the Baron to his death. In the castle, Viktor returns to a sleeping Eva and when she awakens, he turns to leave. Eva asks him to stay and he introduces himself to her with his name. She tells him the meaning of his name, which pleases him. She asks if he knows who made him and he reveals that it was the Baron. Reunited, they head off to Venice to fulfill Rinaldo's dream.

Cast

Production
Frankstein's full name in the film is Baron Charles Frankenstein, unlike Mary Shelley's Victor Frankenstein or the classic Universal Studios movie's Henry Frankenstein. The dwarf in the film is named Rinaldo, after the name of blacklisted Abbott and Costello Meet Frankenstein screenwriter Frederic I. Rinaldo, who also wrote the scripts for several Universal films, including Abbott and Costello Meet the Invisible Man (1951); Hold That Ghost (1941); The Black Cat (1941) and The Invisible Woman (1940).

Filming
Principal photography of The Bride began on June 6, 1984 at Lee International's Shepperton Studios in England. Location filming took place in France. Shooting and completed in December 1984. Some scenes were shot amidst the statuary at the Gardens of Bomarzo in Lazio, Italy.

Release

Box office
Columbia Pictures released the film theatrically in North America on August 16, 1985 and it grossed $3,558,669 at the U.S. box office. The film opened theatrically in the United Kingdom on November 1, 1985, premiering in London.

Critical reception
Colin Greenland reviewed The Bride for White Dwarf #73, and stated that "Derek Hayes and Phil Austin animate a powerful story with close affinities to the best strips in magazines like Warrior or Escape. Go and see it."

The film earned negative reviews from critics and holds a 27% rating on Rotten Tomatoes based on 15 reviews. Jennifer Beals' performance in the film earned her a Razzie Award nomination for Worst Actress.

Home media
The film was released on DVD by Columbia TriStar Home Entertainment in 2001.

Scream Factory released the film on Blu-ray September 25, 2018 featuring an audio commentary from Franc Roddam, as well as interviews with Roddam and Clancy Brown.

See also
 List of films featuring Frankenstein's monster

References

External links

 
 
 

1985 films
1985 horror films
American science fiction horror films
American fantasy films
British horror films
British fantasy films
Columbia Pictures films
Films based on horror novels
Films directed by Franc Roddam
Films set in Budapest
Films set in castles
Films set in Europe
Films shot in England
Films shot in France
Frankenstein films
Romantic period films
1980s English-language films
1980s American films
1980s British films